Godar is a Municipality in the Dhanusa District in the Janakpur Zone of southeastern Nepal. At the time of the 1991 Nepal census it had a population of 6,390 persons living in 1290 individual households.

References

External links
UN map of the municipalities of Dhanusa District

Populated places in Dhanusha District